Kenmore High School was a public high school in Akron, Ohio, United States. At the time of its closure in 2017, it was one of seven high schools in the Akron Public Schools. Athletic teams were known as the Cardinals and the school competed as a member of the Akron City Series. 

The school closed after the 2016–17 school year and was merged with Garfield High School. The merged school, initially known as Kenmore–Garfield High School, was housed at the Kenmore High School building from 2017 to 2022 while a new facility was built on the site of Garfield High School. Upon moving to the new site, the school was renamed Garfield Community Learning Center.

History
The original Kenmore High School was constructed in 1916. Population in the Village of Kenmore grew rapidly, which resulted in an addition the next year. It was originally part of the Coventry Township District, but was annexed to the Akron Public Schools in 1929. The school housed elementary and high school students for many years. More additions were made to the school in 1952 and 1955. The oldest parts of the school were razed, and the current Kenmore High School was built in 1981.

Kenmore merged with Garfield High School for the 2017–18 school year due to declining enrollment and rising costs.  While the new building is constructed at the Garfield site, the combined school will be known as Kenmore-Garfield. Kenmore-Garfield High School opened in the fall of 2017.

In May 2021, it was announced that the new building at the Garfield site would be called Garfield Community Learning Center, which the school board hoped would allow the Kenmore name to stay on a building in the Kenmore neighborhood.

Notable alumni and faculty
 Cliff Battles - former NFL player & coach, Pro Football Hall of Fame inductee
 Don Buckey - former NFL wide receiver and member of New York Jets, member of 1975 College Football All-America Team
 Rick Forzano - former Detroit Lions head coach
 Gary Pinkel - former head football coach for the University of Missouri
 Don Plusquellic - longest-serving mayor of Akron
 Tim "Ripper" Owens - former lead singer of Judas Priest
 Mike W. Barr - comic book and mystery writer

References

External links
 District Website

High schools in Akron, Ohio
Public high schools in Ohio